Frank Secich (born June 14, 1951) is an American rock musician, songwriter, author and record producer.
He was the bass player and founding member of the group Blue Ash from 1969 to 1979 and guitarist and bassist for the Stiv Bators band from 1979 until 1981. He played in the Cleveland-based group Club Wow with Jimmy Zero of the Dead Boys from 1982 to 1985 and produced the Ohio band the Infidels from 1985 to 1990. He is currently the rhythm guitarist for the Deadbeat Poets who were formed in 2006 in Youngstown, Ohio. Frank Secich's autobiography "Circumstantial Evidence" was published by High Voltage Publishing of Australia in 2015. His current band, The Deadbeat Poets are on Pop Detective Records, which is owned by Mark Hershberger.

Discography

LP's and CD's

Blue Ash-No More, No Less-1973 Mercury LP SRM1-666
Blue Ash- Front Page News-1977 LP PZ 34918 U.S., Venezuela
Stiv Bators-Disconnected-1980 Bomp! LP 4015 U.S.], Canada, Finland, Germany, Japan
Stiv Bators-The Lord And The New Creatures LP France 1983
Infidels-Mad About That Girl 1985 LP France Producer
Infidels-9:25 And Seven Seconds-1987 LP-Producer
Infidels-Wondrous Strange-1989-CD Producer
Stiv Bators-Stiv Bators/Night Of The Living Dead Boys-1989 Revenge 16/18 France
Dead Boys- Night Of The Living Dead Boys-Bonus Tracks-1994 Bomp!
Stiv Bators-L.A. L.A. 1994 Bomp! BCD 4046 U.S., Japan
Stiv Bators-Les Genies Du Rock (Sonic Reducer) 1994 Editions Atlas France
Blue Ash-Around Again-2CD(A Collection Of Rarities From The Vault)2004 Not Lame NL 093
Stiv Bators-Disconnected-25th Anniversary Edition-2004 Bomp! 4015-2
Stiv Bators- LA Confidential-2004 Bomp! BCD/LP 4089
Blue Ash -The Alternate Around Again-2007-Powerpop Lovers
Deadbeat Poets-Notes From The Underground 2007 Pop Detective CD U.S., Japan
Blue Ash-No More, No Less-2008 Collectors' Choice CD
Deadbeat Poets-Circustown-2010 CD Pop Detective
Deadbeat Poets-Youngstown Vortex Sutra (The British Version)CD-2011 Pop Detective
Deadbeat Poets-A Deadbeat Christmas-2011 CD Pop Detective
Deadbeat Poets-American Stroboscope-2012 CD Pop Detective
Deadbeat Poets -Hallelujah Anyway-2014 Lp/CD Pop Detective
Dead Boys -It's Cold Outside-2015 Double Live CD Time Bomb Records Japan
Blue Ash- Hearts & Arrows-2015 2 LP Set- You Are The Cosmos Spain
Deadbeat Poets-El Camino Real 101-2016 LP You Are The Cosmos Spain
Deadbeat Poets-Strange Tales From The Hussmann Building-2016 (Best Of 2007–2014) LP/CD Pop Detective Records
Blue Ash-15 Number Ones In A Perfect World-2016 CD- You Are The Cosmos Spain
Club Wow-Nowhere Fast-2016 CD/DVD-Zero Hour Records Australia

Singles and EP's

Blue Ash-Abracadabra (Have You Seen Her?) b/w Dusty Old Fairgrounds 1973
Blue Ash-I Remember A Time b/w Plain To See 1973
Blue Ash-Anytime At All b/w She's So Nice 1974
Blue Ash-Look At You Now b/w Singing And Dancing Away 1977
Blue Ash-You Are All I Need b/w Jazel Jane 1977
Stiv Bators-It's Cold Outside b/w The Last Year 1979 U.S., England, Germany
Stiv Bators-Not That Way Anymore b/w Circumstantial Evidence 1980 U.S., Australia, Germany, Spain
Stiv Bators-Too Much To Dream b/w Make Up Your Mind 1981
Stiv Bators-Too Much To Dream-Newslines Vol. 1 EP 1981 Germany
Infidels-Mad About That Girl b/w A Thousand Years Ago 1985 Producer
Infidels-The Infidels X 4 EP 1986 Producer
Infidels-I Can't Make You Mine b/w Everywhere I Go 1987 Producer
Dead Boys-All The Way Down (Poison Lady) b/w The Nights Are So Long 1987 Producer
Infidels-Run Away From You Flexi-Disc Hartbeat! #8 Germany 1988 Producer
Infidels-Final Solution Flexi-Disc Hartbeat! #9 Germany 1989 Producer
Dead Boys-It's All Right b/w War Zone 2000
Deadbeat Poets-Johnny Sincere-Pop Detective Records 2013
Stiv Bators & David Quinton-Make Up Your Mind- Ugly Pop Records 041 2013 Bass Canada
Stiv Bators & Dead Boys-Last Stand 1980 EP- Ugly Pop Records 042 2013 Bass-Vocals Canada
Blue Ash 4 song 7-inch EP-You Are The Cosmos 2014 Spain
Deadbeat Poets Joe The Mynah Bird EP-2015 KOTJ 11 Spain
Deadbeat Poets It's Summertime b/w I'll Be Standing By-CD Single-Pop Detective Records CDEP 10 2016
Blue Ash Abracadabra (Have You Seen Her?) b/w Hippy, Hippy Shake-Get Hip Records Archive Series 7-inch vinyl 2016

Compilations
Stiv Bators-"It's Cold Outside" Rock Lines-Line LLP 5014 Germany 1979
Stiv Bators-"It's Cold Outside" Yesterday's Sound Today Line Records Germany 1979
Stiv Bators-"Circumstantial Evidence" & "I'll Be Alright" Where The Action Is!-Bomp! 1980
Stiv Bators-"It's Cold Outside" & "The Last Year" Romantics And Friends-Quark Catch 3 1980
Stiv Bators-"A Million Miles Away" Experiments In Destiny-Bomp! 4016 (2) 1980
Infidels-"You Should See Yourself" We Can Work It Out-GMG 75018 France 1987 Producer
Hard Luck & Kashmyre-"Love Only Me" & "47 Heaven" Scream Out Loud Vol. I 1987 Producer
Blue Ash-"Dusty Old Fairgrounds" The Songs Of Bob Dylan-Start 20 England 1989
Infidels-"Any Way You Want It" The Munster Dance Hall Favorites Vol. III- Munster 003 Spain 1990 Producer
Blue Ash-"Dusty Old Fairgrounds" I Shall Be Unreleased: The Songs Of Bob Dylan - Rhino 70518 1991
Stiv Bators-"Boxed Set Of 5 Singles" I Wanna Be A Dead Boy- Munster 7029 Spain 1992
Stiv Bators-"The Last Year" Destination Bomp!-Bomp! 4048 1994
Stiv Bators -"It's Cold Outside" Revenge Records France 1995
Stiv Bators-"Make Up Your Mind" The Roots Of Powerpop-Bomp! 1996
Blue Ash-"Abracadabra (Have You Seen Her?)" POPTOPIA! Power Pop Classics Of The '70's - Rhino 72728 1997 U.S., Japan
Blue Ash-"Abracadabra (Have You Seen Her?)" 100% Fun-A Power Pop Collection -Hiro 1001 Japan 1997
Stiv Bators-"It's Cold Outside" Powerpearls Vol. 6 1999
Blue Ash-"Anytime At All" + 3 The History Of Powerpop Vol. 1 Cleveland 2000
Infidels-"A Thousand Years Ago" Shake Some Action Vol. 2 SSA Records Spain 2001 Producer
Stiv Bators-"Not That Way Anymore" Teenline # 7 Hyped-2-Death Records 2001
Stiv Bators-"I'll Be Alright" Teenline #8 Hyped-2-Death Records 2003
Blue Ash-"Pleasant Dreams" International Pop Overthrow Vol. 7 - Not Lame NL 101 2004
Blue Ash-"Say Goodbye" & "She Cried For 15 Years" Planet Of The Popboomerang 2 Australia 2005
Infidels-"Mad About That Girl" Home Runs Vol. 3 Sounds Asleep Records Sweden 2005 Producer
Stiv Bators-"The Last Year" Home Runs Vol. 3 Sounds Asleep Records Sweden 2005
Dukes Of Earl- " Him Or Me" He Put The Bomp! In The Bomp A Tribute To Greg Shaw Bomp/ Vivid Sound Records U.S.,Japan 2007 Producer/Artist
Deadbeat Poets "Ernest T" Unsigned, Sealed & Delivered-Frontline Records-2007 Canada
Blue Ash "Here We Go Again" The Blog Gems Vol. 6 1973-86-Powerpop Lovers-2007 CD
Deadbeat Poets "People These Days" IPO Vol. 13 Not Lame 2010
Deadbeat Poets "The Truth About Flying Saucers" Power Pop Prime Vol. 7 2011
Blue Ash "The Boy Won't Listen" Power Pop Prime Vol. 2 2012
Blue Ash "Abracadabra" Glam-O-Rama Vol. 3 2015 UK
Deadbeat Poets "She's With Me" Unsigned, Sealed and Delivered No. 9 CD 3101 Bullseye Records 2016 Canada
Deadbeat Poets "I'll Be Standing By" Twelve String High (2LP & CD) You Are The Cosmos 2016 Spain
Deadbeat Poets "Joe The Mynah Bird" Godless America-2017-Cassette Only Release
Stiv Bators, Deadbeat Poets (No Compromise, No Regrets) Soundtrack 2019-A Million Miles Away. You Don't Go Away, The Stiv Bators Ghost Tour, Evil Boy. The Psychedelic Gas Station
Deadbeat Poets (Tribute To Sonny Vincent) 2019-"It's Summertime"
Deadbeat Poets"Riding The Dog" Rolling Stone: Life & Death Of Brian Jones (Original Soundtrack) MVD 2020
Blue Ash "It's All In Your Mind" Peppermint Productions LP "Rat Race" 2022
Deadbeat Poets "Sunglass City" Nightclubbing (The Birth Of Punk Rock In New York City) MVD (Original Soundtrack) 2022

Songs Recorded By Other Artists

A Million Miles Away (Secich)-Michael Monroe-Finland, Japan
A Million Miles Away (Secich)-Simon Chainsaw & The Forgotten Boys-Brazil
A Million Miles Away (Secich) - Gonzo Sombrero - Finland
A Thousand Years Ago (Drivere-Secich)-The Infidels-U.S., France, Spain
Abracadabra (Have You Seen Her?) (Secich-Bartolin)-The Records-U.S., England, Greece, New Zealand, Japan
Crime In The Streets (Cabaniss-Quinton-Secich) The Pop Machine
Don't Go Away (Zero-Secich) Stiv Bators France
Everywhere I Go (Secich)-Infidels
Everywhere I Go (Secich)-Billy Sullivan
Evil Boy (Zero-Secich)-Stiv Bators & The Evil Boys-Germany
Evil Boy (Zero-Secich)-Lucky Sperm Club
Evil Boy as "I'm An Evil Bear"(Zero-Secich) Three Speeds
I Wanna Forget You (Just The Way You Are)-(Secich-Bators)-Adam Bomb (Music)-U.S., England
I Wanna Forget You (Just The Way You Are)-(Secich-Bators)- Sybil
I'll Be Alright (Secich-Bators) Hundred Million Martians-Finland
The Last Year (Secich-Bators)-The Monotors-Spain
The Last Year (Secich-Bators)-Palmflower
The Last Year (Secich-Bators)-Riger János-Hungary
Not That Way Anymore (Secich-Bators) Bad Luck Charms 
Not That Way Anymore (Secich-Bators)-Road Vultures
Not That Way Anymore (Secich-Bators) The Tragic Zeroes
Not That Way Anymore (Secich-Bators) Starpower
Not That Way Anymore (Secich-Bators) Unko Atama
Not That Way Anymore (Secich-Bators) Nikki Sudden-England
Not That Way Anymore (Secich-Bators) Stiletto Boys
Not That Way Anymore (Secich-Bators) Billie Joe Armstrong-No Fun Mondays 
Not That Way Anymore (Secich-Bators) Luv Bites-Brazil
Not That Way Anymore (Secich-Bators) RoadBump-Netherlands
The Girl Downstairs (Sullivan-Secich-Zero)-Billy Sullivan
The Stiv Bators Ghost Tour (Secich)-Room Full Of Strangers
Tonight's My Lucky Night (Secich-Bartolin)-Finkers-Australia, Japan
You Don't Go Away (Zero-Secich)-Vibeke Saugestad-Norway
You Don't Go Away (Zero-Secich)-Alpha Kitty

Music Videos
Who's Hieronymus Bosch & Why Is He Saying These Terrible Things About Me?-Deadbeat Poets2012
Johnny Sincere-Deadbeat Poets- Pop Detective Records 2013
Life In The War Zone-There's A Fire-Live At Cleveland Agora Club Wow DVD-Zero Hour Records 2016 Australia
I'll Be Standing By-Deadbeat Poets Pop Detective Records 2016
It's Summertime-Deadbeat Poets Pop Detective Records 2016

Music In Films
D.O.A.: A Rite of Passage
Smother 2007 Official Trailer- Blue Ash-Can't Get Her Off My Mind
Return Of The Living Dead Boys-2008- Bonus feature Interview Frank Secich and Stiv Bators
The Greenman 2011- directed by Joe Shelby-The Goody Wagon- The Green Man- Where Was I When I Needed Me?- Deadbeat Poets
Made In Cleveland 2013- No Island Like The Mind, No Ship Like Beer-Deadbeat Poets
Stiv (No Compromise, No Regrets) 2019- directed by Danny Garcia-A Million Miles Away. You Don't Go Away, The Stiv Bators Ghost Tour, Evil Boy. The Psychedelic Gas Station
Stiv (No Compromise, No Regrets) 2019- official film trailer-Evil Boy
Stiv Bators 2019 Soundtrack (No Compromise, No Regrets)-The Stiv Bators Ghost Tour, Evil Boy, The Psychedelic Gas Station, You Don't Go Away
Rolling Stone: Life and Death of Brian Jones 2020-Riding The Dog
Nightclubbing-The Birth of Punk Rock In NYC 2022-Sunglass City, Film clip of Frank Secich and Stiv Bators
Daisy Jones and the Six Amazon Prime Series Episode 1-Come And Get it-"Jazel Jane" (Secich-Bartolin) Blue Ash

Bibliography
Circumstantial Evidence 2015 Frank Secich Autobiography High Voltage Australia

External links
  Discogs
 Pop Detective Records
 Stiv-Bators
  All Music Guide

1951 births
Living people
People from Sharon, Pennsylvania
Musicians from Ohio